Mark Valentine is an English short story author, editor and essayist on book-collecting.

Short stories
Valentine's short stories have been published in a number of collections and in anthologies. The Collected Connoisseur (Tartarus Press, 2010) is about the mystical encounters of an aesthete whose real name is never revealed, some written jointly with  John Howard. ‘The Descent of the Fire’, a story in this series by Valentine & Howard, was included in the 2004 World Fantasy Award winning anthology Strange Tales edited by Rosalie Parker. Herald of the Hidden (Tartarus Press, 2013) collects stories about Ralph Tyler, a Northamptonshire folklorist.

Other short story collections include  Selected Stories (2012) and Seventeen  Stories (2013). His story ‘Vain Shadows Flee’ was chosen for Best British Short Stories 2016 edited by Nicholas Royle (Salt Publishing). Secret Europe (2012) and Inner Europe (2018) are shared collections with John Howard of stories set in real and fictional European locations.

Studies and essays
He has written studies of Arthur Machen and  Sarban.  He also wrote numerous articles for Book and Magazine Collector, and his essays on book-collecting, minor writers and related subjects have been collected in Haunted By Books (2015) and A Country Still All Mystery (2017).

As editor
Valentine has edited or introduced over forty books, mostly in the supernatural fiction field, including editions of work by Walter de la Mare, Robert Louis Stevenson, Saki, J. Meade Falkner and others. He has also edited anthologies, including The Werewolf Pack (Wordsworth, 2008), The Black Veil (Wordsworth, 2008) and The Scarlet Sin – Stories for Dorian Gray (The Swan River Press, Dublin, 2017).

From 1985 to 1988, he edited Source, a journal about ancient holy wells. He then co-edited (with Roger Dobson) Aklo, a journal of the fantastic, and edited Wormwood, a biannual journal of fantastic literature, from 2003 to 2022.

Publishing
In small press publishing, with Roger Dobson he ran Caermaen Books, principally devoted to titles about Arthur Machen and, with Jo Valentine, he has issued handmade artist books under the Valentine & Valentine imprint. Valentine also published the first book by Joel Lane, a chapbook titled The Foggy, Foggy, Dew.

Recordings
Valentine has also issued sound recordings. As The Mystic Umbrellas, he contributed "Journey to the West", a keyboard piece, to the Deleted Funtime tape (Deleted Records, Dec 009, 1980), and as Radio Dromedary contributed treated shortwave recordings to National Grid 2 (Conventional Tapes, CON 015, 1981). He also issued The Sound of the Sea/The Sound of Pendeen Watch, a sound recording of the sea and a Cornish lighthouse foghorn (Zennor Hill tapes, 1983).

Books

Fiction
In Violet Veils, Tartarus Press (Horam, Sussex), 1999
Masques and Citadels, Tartarus Press (North Yorkshire), 2003
The Rite of Trebizond and Other Tales, with John Howard, Ex Occidente Press (Bucharest, Romania), 2008
The Nightfarers, Ex Occidente Press (Bucharest, Romania), 2009. Reprinted Tartarus Press (North Yorkshire), 2020
The Collected Connoisseur, with John Howard, Tartarus Press (North Yorkshire), 2010
The Mascarons of the Late Empire & Other Studies, Passport Levant (Bucharest, Romania), 2010
The Peacock Escritoire, Passport Levant (Bucharest, Romania), 2011
Secret Europe, with John Howard, Ex Occidente Press (Bucharest, Romania), 2012
Selected Stories, Swan River Press (Dublin), 2012
Herald of the Hidden & Other Stories, Tartarus Press (North Yorkshire), 2013
Seventeen Stories, Swan River Press (Dublin), 2013
The Uncertainty of All Earthly Things, Zagava (Germany), 2018
Inner Europe, with John Howard, Tartarus Press (North Yorkshire), 2018
Powers and Presences, with John Howard, Sarob Press (France), 2020
The Fig Garden, Tartarus Press (North Yorkshire), 2022

Poetry

At Dusk, Ex Occidente Press (Bucharest, Romania) 2012
Star Kites: Poems & Versions, Tartarus Press (North Yorkshire), 2013
Astarology, Salò Press (Norwich), 2021

Non Fiction
Arthur Machen, Seren Books, 1985
Time, a Falconer: A Study of Sarban, Tartarus Press (North Yorkshire), 2010
Haunted By Books, Tartarus Press (North Yorkshire), 2015
A Country Still All Mystery, Tartarus Press (North Yorkshire), 2017
The Secret Ceremonies: Critical Essays on Arthur Machen (co-edited with Timothy J Jarvis), Hippocampus Press, 2019
A Wild Tumultory Library, Tartarus Press, 2019
Sphinxes and Obelisks, Tartarus Press, 2021

References

External links
 Wormwoodiana
 Interview with a Book Collector
 

Living people
English biographers
English short story writers
English horror writers
Ghost story writers
Year of birth missing (living people)